Monument Valley may refer to:

Places
 Monument Valley, a region of the Colorado Plateau
 Monument Valley Park, a historic park in Colorado Springs, Colorado

Arts, entertainment, and media
 Monument Valley, a Buckethead album
 Monument Valley (video game), a 2014 puzzle game developed by Ustwo
 Monument Valley 2, its 2017 sequel

Other uses
 Monument Valley High School, a high school in Kayenta, Arizona
 Monument Valley Film Festival, a film festival held in Kayenta, Arizona

See also 
 Oljato-Monument Valley (disambiguation)